The 1943–44 NHL season was the 27th season of the National Hockey League. Six teams played 50 games each. The Montreal Canadiens were the top team of the regular season and followed it up with the team's fifth Stanley Cup championship.

League business
In memory of Frank Calder, the former NHL President who died in 1943, the league's Board of Governors donated the Calder Memorial Trophy to be awarded to the NHL's top rookie.

Due to World War II, 75 per cent of the amateurs signed by the NHL ended up in the armed services. In April 1943, Canadian Amateur Hockey Association past-president George Dudley recommended that payments from the NHL for signing amateurs be deferred until players lost due to the wartime enlistments return to professional hockey. The NHL negotiated with W. G. Hardy and the International Ice Hockey Association to sign more junior-aged players than usual, due to World War II travel restrictions. The Canadian Press reported that Hardy was rumored to be appointed president of the NHL, to replace Red Dutton who had been acting president since the death of Calder.

Rule changes

NHL rules committee chairman Frank Boucher and Ottawa District Hockey Association executive Cecil Duncan collaborated to experiment with then introduce the centre ice red line to the hockey rink, in an effort to open up the game and allow the defending team to pass the puck out of their own zone and counter-attack quicker.

"This rule is considered to mark the beginning of the modern era in the NHL," according to the NHL's Guide and Record Book.  In 2005, 62 years later, the two-line pass would be legalized for similar reasons.

Regular season
The Montreal Canadiens had turned the corner and now Tommy Gorman and Dick Irvin had a team to make the fans happy. Bill Durnan solved the goaltending woes, but not before Gorman had all kinds of problems signing him. Durnan knew his worth, and wanted a handsome sum. Just before the first game, Gorman agreed to his contract demands. He was worth every penny, as he ran away with the Vezina Trophy and the Canadiens lost only five games all year, finishing first by a wide margin. The new and more familiar "Punch line" of Elmer Lach, Toe Blake, and Maurice Richard dominated the offence and Richard had 32 goals. He replaced Joe Benoit, who did his duty to his country by joining the armed forces. Richard, in fact, was dubbed by teammate Ray Getliffe the nickname that would be his
legend "The Rocket".

When Paul Bibeault came back from the Army, he found his job lost to the best goaltender in the NHL, Bill Durnan. Montreal agreed to loan him to Toronto, where he played very well, leading the Leafs to third place and leading the NHL with five shutouts. Gus Bodnar, a crack centre, was the top rookie, and for the first time, a team produced Calder Memorial Trophy winners in consecutive years. In fact, Bodnar scored the fastest goal by a rookie in his very first game. It took him only 15 seconds to score on Ken McAuley, Ranger goaltender, in a 5–2 win over the war-weakened Rangers.

The Rangers had plunged to last place the previous year and Lester Patrick was so discouraged that he wanted to suspend operations for the year. This year the Rangers lost Clint Smith, Lynn Patrick, Phil Watson, and Alf Pike. The most unbelievably inept team iced for the Rangers this year. Things were so desperate that coach Frank Boucher had to come out of retirement to play some. But the Rangers set a modern-day record of 6.20 goals against, giving up 310 goals in 50 games. One night when Lester Patrick went behind the bench to coach the team with Frank Boucher attending a brother's funeral, the Rangers were demolished 15–0 by Detroit as the Red Wings set a modern-day record of most goals by a team in a single game. It was a horrifying experience for Patrick. Only a week later Syd Howe set a modern-day record of 6 goals in a game in a 12–2 conquest of the hapless Rangers. The Rangers won only 6 games all year and finished a distant last, 26 points behind fifth-place Boston.

Chicago started with sub-par goaltending, but then president and general manager Bill Tobin decided to bring back Mike Karakas, who had been demoted to the minors in 1939–40 for his lackluster play. Karakas was just what the Black Hawks needed, as he played well and recorded three shutouts and got the team into the playoffs.

In Boston, the Bruins lost star forward Bill Cowley to injury after the first 36 games. At that point in the season Cowley was on pace to set a new standard in scoring for the NHL. After the first 36 games he had scored 30 goals – 41 assists – 71 points before going down to injury. However, the scoring title would still eventually end up in Boston as linemate Herb Cain picked up the slack, scoring 82 points over the course of the 50-game schedule and setting a new record for points in the regular season.

Final standings

Playoffs

Playoff bracket

Semifinals

(1) Montreal Canadiens vs. (3) Toronto Maple Leafs

The Montreal Canadiens finished first in the league with 83 points. The Toronto Maple Leafs finished third in the league with 50 points. This was the third playoff meeting between these two teams with the teams splitting the two previous series. They last met in the 1925 NHL Championship where Montreal won a two-game total goals series 5–2. Montreal won this year's ten game regular season series earning fifteen of twenty points. Maurice "Rocket" Richard was named first, second, and third Star of the game after scoring all 5 Montreal goals in game two, the first player to have this honour.

(2) Detroit Red Wings vs. (4) Chicago Black Hawks

The Detroit Red Wings finished second in the league with 58 points. The Chicago Black Hawks finished fourth with 49 points. This was the third playoff meeting between these two teams with the teams splitting the two previous series. They last met in the 1941 Stanley Cup Semifinals where Detroit won in two games. The teams split this year's ten-game regular season series.

Stanley Cup Finals

This was the sixth playoff meeting between these two teams with Chicago winning three of the five previous series. They last met in the 1941 Stanley Cup Quarterfinals where Chicago won in three games. Montreal won this year's ten game regular season series earning eighteen of twenty points.

Awards

Player statistics

Scoring leaders
Note: GP = Games played, G = Goals, A = Assists, PTS = Points, PIM = Penalties in minutes

Source: NHL

Leading goaltenders

Note: GP = Games played; Mins = Minutes played; GA = Goals against; GAA = Goals against average; W = Wins; L = Losses; T = Ties; SO = Shutouts

Coaches
Boston Bruins: Art Ross
Chicago Black Hawks: Paul Thompson
Detroit Red Wings: Jack Adams
Montreal Canadiens: Dick Irvin
New York Rangers: Frank Boucher
Toronto Maple Leafs: Hap Day

Debuts
The following is a list of players of note who played their first NHL game in 1943–44 (listed with their first team, asterisk(*) marks debut in playoffs):
Harry Lumley, Detroit Red Wings
Bill Durnan, Montreal Canadiens
Don Raleigh, New York Rangers
Gus Bodnar, Toronto Maple Leafs

Last games
The following is a list of players of note who played their last game in the NHL in 1943–44 (listed with their last team):
Buzz Boll, Boston Bruins
Busher Jackson, Boston Bruins
Frank Boucher, New York Rangers

See also
1943-44 NHL transactions
List of Stanley Cup champions
1943 in sports
1944 in sports

References
 
 
 
 
 
 

Notes

External links
Hockey Database
NHL.com

 
1
1